Bronisław Gancarz (October 31, 1906 in Rudnik nad Sanem - September 30, 1960 in Nisko) was a Polish track and field athlete. Gancarz competed in the men's marathon for Poland at the 1936 Summer Olympics. He finished in 33rd place.

During World War II, he fought in the Polish Army in the September Campaign.

External links
Olympic profile

1906 births
1960 deaths
Olympic athletes of Poland
Athletes (track and field) at the 1936 Summer Olympics
Polish male long-distance runners
Polish military personnel of World War II
People from Nisko County
Sportspeople from Podkarpackie Voivodeship
Polish Austro-Hungarians
People from the Kingdom of Galicia and Lodomeria